Denis Ivanovich Bukhryakov (born 28 April 1981) is a former Russian professional footballer.

Club career
He made his professional debut in the Russian Second Division in 1999 for FC Amur-Energiya Blagoveshchensk.

He is the only player in the history of Sibir Novosibirsk who helped the team to be promoted from the Russian Second Division to the First Division in 2004, and to the Russian Premier League in 2009.

References

1981 births
Living people
People from Blagoveshchensk
Russian footballers
FC Sibir Novosibirsk players
Russian Premier League players
Association football defenders
FC Novokuznetsk players
FC Amur Blagoveshchensk players
Sportspeople from Amur Oblast